Climate change has a significant direct effect on terrestrial animals, by being a major driver of the processes of speciation and extinction. The best known example of this is the Carboniferous rainforest collapse, which occurred 305 million years ago. This event decimated amphibian populations and spurred on the evolution of reptiles. In general, climate change affects animals and birdlife in various different ways. Birds lay their eggs earlier than usual in the year, plants bloom earlier and mammals come out of their hibernation state earlier.

Climate change is a natural event that has occurred throughout history. However, with the recent increased emission of CO2 in the Earth's atmosphere, abrupt climate change has occurred. It has been hypothesized that anthropogenic greenhouse gas forcing has significantly influenced global climate since about 8000 before present (Van Hoof 2006).

Animals have had specific responses to climate change. Species respond to climate changes by migration, adaptation, or if neither of those occur, death. These migrations can sometimes follow an animal's preferred temperature, elevation, soil, etc., as said terrain moves due to climate change. Adaptation can be either genetic or phenological, and death can occur in a local population only (extirpation) or as an entire species, otherwise known as extinction.

Climate change is projected to affect individual organisms, populations, species distributions and ecosystem composition and function both directly (e.g., increased temperatures and changes in precipitation) and indirectly (through climate changing the intensity and frequency of disturbances such as wildfires and severe storms) (IPCC 2002).

Every organism has a distinct set of preferences or requirements, a niche, and biodiversity has been tied to the diversity of animals' niches. These can include or be affected by temperature, aridity, resource availability, habitat requirements, enemies, soil characteristics, competitors, and pollinators. Since the factors that compose a niche can be so complex and interconnected, the niches of many animals are bound to be affected by climate change (Parmesan Yohe 2003).

One study done by Camille Parmesan and Gary Yohe from the University of Texas at Austin shows the global fingerprint of climate change on natural systems. The results of their global analysis of 334 species were recorded to demonstrate the correlation of patterns consistent with global climate change of the 20th century. Using the IPCC's (Intergovernmental Panel on Climate Change) "levels of confidence", this study proved significant nonrandom behavioral changes due to global climate change with very high confidence (> 95%). Furthermore, an accuracy of 74–91% change in species has displayed predicted change for species in response to climate change.

Habitat fragmentation
During the Carboniferous rainforest collapse, the vast and lush rainforests of Laurasia, or commonly known as Euramerica, were destroyed, fragmenting into small "islands" in a much less diverse landscape. This event decimated amphibian populations and spurred the evolution of reptiles.

Increased temperatures

The rising temperatures as a result of climate change have been changing the lifestyle of terrestrial animals. Warmer days combined with extended periods of droughts and intense storms are becoming the new normal and terrestrial animals across the world are feeling the impacts. There are many examples of this worldwide. Physiological ecologist Eric Riddell states, “We often think that climate change may cause a mass mortality event in the future, but this study tells us that the change in climate that has already occurred is too hot and in certain areas, animals can’t tolerate the warming and drying that has already occurred” (Robbins). The impacts of living in a hotter world are no longer a future concern, this intense life changing warming of the earth is already a reality on the horizon. Another example of this warming's detrimental impact on terrestrial life can be seen in the Mojave Desert. Average temperatures have increased by 3.6 degrees Fahrenheit — effectively making the world's hottest place even hotter.  Warmer climates are causing major damage to ecosystems: especially to the world's forests. Due to high temperatures, fires are becoming larger and more deadlier. These fires are the reason why rainforests are struggling to survive and the animals there as well. The terrestrial need trees to survive and with fires constant burning them down, they are struggling to find shelter.

An increase in temperature coupled with more sporadic rain has become the new normal in the Mediterranean, Madagascar, and the Cerrado-Pantanal of Argentina, to name a few. In such areas, terrestrial animals have been majorly suffering as a result. For example, the decrease in rain has impacted the water supplies of African elephants, who normally would drink 150 to 300 liters of water daily. Further, 96 percent of the breeding grounds of Sundarbans tigers could be fully submerged by sea-level rise. (Gade and Payne)

Australia has also been experiencing extreme heat waves, which has had horrific impacts on both terrestrial and aquatic ecosystems. In 2014, for example, an intense heat wave killed off more than 45,000 bats of various species. In some areas of the country, it was so bad that fire trucks were deployed to spray and cool off dying bats.

Along the same vein, research has shown that birds suffer more from heat than most other animals. When they get warm, birds exhale air and water. The hotter they get, the more water they must expel. If such rising temperatures seem to increase, there will certainly be a decrease in the desert bird population. Riddell says, “Even desert specialists are struggling to live in this environment that they are supposedly well adapted for” (Robbins).

The impact of these rising temperatures have been interesting to observe within the insect population. The bumblebee population has fallen about 46 percent in the US and 17 percent in Europe. The areas where the bumblebee population has fallen are also places with extremely high climate variability, especially in terms of these higher temperatures. However, this increase of temperature has led some insect populations to flourish. Warmer areas lead to exponential increases in the metabolic rates of some types of insects. Excluding the tropic regions, warmer temperatures will lead to increases in the reproductive rates of insects.

Severe weather

With rising global temperatures, terrestrial organisms will face greater hazards in the forms of increasingly frequent and more severe meteorological conditions such as droughts, snow storms, heat waves, hurricanes, and melting glaciers and sea ice.

These severe weather shifts can lead to a mismatch of resource availability known as trophic mismatch. Although these mismatches haven't been deemed a negative impact, the long-term impacts are still unknown. Climate cues have been known to time biological processes such as reproduction. These weather fluctuations may in turn cause these cues to irregular and inconsistent. However, the effects of these weather fluctuations are not yet known.

These harsher weather conditions will cause problems for terrestrial wildlife because their usual habitats will be significantly impacted, leading them to go extinct, migrate elsewhere or find ways to adapt to their new conditions. These ecological responses vary based on the situation. This was shown even in a 2018 study done at the University of Queensland, where over 350 observational studies were done on terrestrial animal populations (for over a year), with results showing a positive correlation between increased severe weather conditions in ecosystems and population declines or extinctions.

As rainfall increases in alpine climates, bird populations such as Savannah Sparrows and Horned Larks have higher nest mortalities. One study in 2017 found that these bird populations had higher daily nest mortalities if their environment rained consecutively for more than two days, compared with no rain at all. This increased rainfall in an alpine climate may very well be due to increased global temperatures.

Further demonstrations of severe weather and its impact on wildlife can be seen in a 1985 study. The researchers attached mortality-sensing radio transmitters to jack rabbits in a 700 km2 area in Utah and observed their activities during the winter of 1982. They detected thirty-seven mortalities, most likely due to a combination of severe weather patterns: daily minimum ambient temperatures that were 10-20 degrees Celsius below normal, snow accumulation that was four times greater than the past four years, and wind velocities of 80-95 kilometers per hour. Similarly, winter-associated extreme weather events increased the mortality of northern Montana Pronghorns as discovered in a 1967 study. It was found that the extreme levels of snowfall led to malnutrition of these antelopes, which led to high mortality rates. Severe winter weather events also contributed to a decrease in the breeding of Missouri cottontails. Due to unusually high amounts of snowfall and prolonged cold, Missouri cottontails did not reproduce as normal.

One study discussed the impact of extreme weather on various populations, including humans. There are observed effects on human mortality and morbidity if there is a series of days during the summer in which minimum temperatures exceed thirty degrees Celsius. This can also be applied to domestic cattle, where populations decline due to heat stress if THI (temperature and humidity index) values are greater than 84 for three days. A similar catastrophic extreme heat event took place in Australia, where thousands of flying foxes were killed due to heat stress. These foxes live comfortably below forty-two degrees Celsius, but recent climate change has led to higher temperatures and led to thousands of flying fox deaths. Carnaby's Black Cockatoo is another animal in danger of climate-related extreme weather events in Australia. In southwestern Australia, there has been a large decrease in population of this species, which is largely due to exposure to extremely hot days as well as severe localized hail storms. Researchers predict that further climate change will lead to increased occurrences of heat waves and hail storms in southwestern Australia.

It is predicted that with climate change, there is an increase in heat waves, droughts, and heavy rainfalls. In the arctic, there are already extreme warm-spells and heavy rain-on-snow events. A study in 2014 found the effects of these events on permafrost characteristics in the High Arctic Svalbard. They found a significant increase in average temperature in the area, which is normally well below zero degrees Celsius. They also found extremely high levels of precipitation, which led to significantly increased permafrost temperatures up to five meters in depth. This increase in rainfall led to avalanches, which led to starvation among the reindeer population since their winter food supply was blocked.

Wildfires 

Paired with anthropogenic factors such as undeveloped forest management practices and deforestation, climate changes have increased the severity and number of severe wildfires. Even just in California, the 2020 season contained five of the twenty largest wildfires in the state's history, according to the California Department of Forestry and Fire Protection. With rising global temperatures caused in part by the greenhouse gas effect, some areas have been more susceptible to droughts and heatwaves, which amplify the risks and consequences of these wildfires.

Additionally, wildfires often act as a positive feedback loop. The emissions and arid conditions that result from the fires contribute to a higher likelihood of these wildfires occurring again in the recent future.

Although many animals have adapted to local wildfires, the variability and ruthlessness of these recent wildfires have caused devastating impacts to terrestrial animals. The most direct result is the loss of life in the fires themselves. Notably, over 1 billion animals were killed in the 2019-2020 Australia bushfire season, including large numbers of threatened or endangered species such as koalas. Additionally, with the intense habitat destruction that comes with these augmented fires, it is estimated 2 billion more animals were displaced from their habitats in these same fires. The Kate's leaf tailed gecko lost the entire expanse of its habitat destroyed. Recovery for these deep burns is a long and incomplete process.

It has been a difficult task to estimate just how impactful fires such as the 2019-2020 bushfire season have been, and more work needs to be done to truly understand the ramifications on terrestrial mammals. However, there are species that have not been seen since these events. This list includes the Kangaroo Island micro-trapdoor spider and the Kangaroo Island assassin spider. Any extinction can be devastating to a food web, snowballing into a negative feedback loop that affects the entire ecological system.

When large-scale burns level a forested area, the native species could be quickly replaced by pioneer invasive species, which create an even less suitable environment for the animals who previously occupied it. As temperatures continue to rise, and these localized areas become more climactically variable and vulnerable to other indirect effects, such as disease and trauma.

Phenology
Phenology is the study of life cycles of animals or plants due to seasonal or other variable climate changes. These responses by animals due to climate change may or may not be genetic.

Researchers are exploring ways to breed livestock like chickens, turkeys, and pigs to better withstand the heat.

Climate change has advanced the time of evening when Brazilian free-tailed bats (Tadarida brasiliensis) emerge to feed. This change is believed to be related to the drying of regions as temperatures rise. This earlier emergence exposes the bats to greater predation increased competition with other insectivores who feed in the twilight or daylight hours.

Hunting/Urbanized Communities 
Because of human habitat fragmentation and illegal hunting, sub-Saharan Africa has been observed as the region with the largest numbers of terrestrial animals listed as endangered (Duporge, I. 2020). Coexisting with these animals means that livestock is compromised and humans would have to compete with these apex predators for the same food and be forced to defend the livestock of the community. Therefore, we have seen multiple attempts at suppressing the population numbers of terrestrial animals via poaching and illegal hunting. Illegal hunting and roadkill have both influenced the number and diversity of  animals. Poaching has increased during the wet seasons when roads are tricky to patrol (Duporge, I. 2020).

Conservation efforts to help gray wolves in Germany has been through the use of a Green bridge, or a large vegetated overpasses, designed to accommodate the movement of wildlife over transportation corridors and major highways (Plaschke, 2020). Roads have been a major hindrance for animals to reconnect with the natural environment near urbanized societies. In Germany, it has been seen that 4 different species, including wolves and their subsequent prey use these bridges in difference seasons (Plaschke, 2020). These bridges showed a promising result of conservation and sustainability.

Indirect effects

Effects on vegetation and agriculture

The increasing global temperature has been devastating for the polar and equatorial regions, and the change in temperature in these already extreme regions has destroyed their fragile equilibrium. In the sub-Saharan regions, deserts are experiencing severe droughts that affect both water and agricultural resources, since crop production is harshly affected.

Droughts, floods or changes in precipitation and warmth all influence the quality and amount of vegetation present in a region, in addition to the soil fertility and plant diversity. A region with vegetation or crops that have minimal tolerances and resilience to changes is at risk due to the uncertainty of the future effects of climate changes on crops and edible vegetation.

This direct effect of climate change has an indirect effect on the health of terrestrial animals, since changes in their dietary availability will impact not only herbivores but all other terrestrial creatures in their food webs. Some of the negative impacts include:
	
 Extinctions or declines in populations 
 Increased competition for remaining resources
 increased foraging difficulty: for example, increased snowfall in northern latitude can make it harder for elk to find food
 Migration
 Changes in phenology
 Evolutionary favouring: species with less dietary restrictions will thrive in certain regions
 Reduced livestock production

Effects on the health of terrestrial animals and livestock
Livestock:

While an increase in temperature will be beneficial for livestock living in areas with cold winters, it won't be for livestock in the remaining geographic areas of the world. The progressive increase in temperature in addition to an increase in frequency and intensity of heatwaves will surely have a negative impact on livestock, in the form of heat stress. Heat stress can have a negative effect on livestock by causing metabolic disorders, oxidative stress, immune suppression and/or death.

 Metabolic Disorders: 
 Homeothermic animals like livestock respond to high temperatures by increasing their respiratory and sweating rates to reduce their body temperature. They also decrease feed intake in response to high temperatures, and while these responses may be preventing livestock from having hyperthermia, they can also lead to metabolic disorders. Lameness in beef and dairy cows, which is “defined as any foot abnormality that causes an animal to change the way that it walks”, can be attributed to heat stress. There are other factors that could cause lameness, like disease or management, but the way heat stress contributes to lameness is likely either due to “ruminal acidosis or increased output of bicarbonate”. Ruminal acidosis occurs because, during cooler times of the day, heat-stressed cattle eat less frequently but eat more at each feeding. The heat-stressed cattle's reduced feeding during the hotter part of the day in conjunction with feeding more during cooler parts makes them more susceptible to acidosis, and acidosis is a major cause of laminitis. The increased output of bicarbonate occurs because higher temperatures cause cattle to do more panting in an attempt to cool down, but this panting results in a rapid loss of carbon dioxide which leads to respiratory alkalosis. To compensate, cattle then increase their urinary output of bicarbonate. This compensation furthermore leads to issues with rumen buffering because of a reduced amount of bicarbonate present and lameness appears as a result anywhere from a few weeks to a few months later. 
 The reduction of feed intake and increased energy expenditure to cool the body down when experiencing higher temperatures can also lead to ketosis. Ketosis occurs when an animal “is in a severe state of negative energy balance, undergoes intense lipomobilization, and accumulates ketone bodies, which derive from incomplete catabolism of fat”. Studies have also shown that cattle mobilize adipose tissue during heat stress, and liver lipidosis occurs as a result. Liver lipidosis and the reduced liver function that comes along with it was confirmed in heat-stressed cattle by their reduced albumin secretion and liver enzyme activity. 
 Oxidative Stress:
 Studies have found that oxidative stress may play a role in several pathological conditions that might impact animal production and welfare. Resulting from “an imbalance between oxidant and antioxidant molecules”, a correlation between heat stress and oxidative stress has been identified. Findings have shown that heat stress causes an increase in antioxidant enzyme activities, which leads to the production of antioxidants and causes an imbalance of oxidant and antioxidant molecules, which is also known as oxidative stress. 
 Immune Suppression:
 The immune system is important for preventing “invasion of pathogenic organisms”. Studies have shown that heat stress impairs the function of the immune system in livestock, which leaves livestock vulnerable to acquiring different infections or diseases. This would lead to a trickle-down effect where reproductive efficiency and overall production are negatively affected as well. A study by Lecchi et al. found that higher temperatures negatively impacted neutrophil function, which leaves mammary glands of dairy cattle vulnerable to infection. Mastitis is an endemic disease of cattle that is caused by an “immune response to bacterial invasion of the teat canal or as a result of chemical, mechanical, or thermal injury to the cow’s udder”. With an increased presence of mastitis during the summer months when temperatures are higher, it is suspected that high temperatures are to blame and as temperatures increase due to climate change, infections like mastitis could become more prevalent, having a detrimental effect on livestock.  
 Death:
 Many studies have shown that mortality rates are higher during the hottest months, with higher temperatures causing “heat stroke, heat exhaustion, heat syncope, heat cramps, and ultimately organ dysfunction”. These health complications occur when body temperature is 3 to 4 ℃ above normal. A multitude of deaths during heat waves has also been observed. During one heatwave that occurred in the French regions of Brittany and Pays-de-la-Loire, thousands of pigs, poultry, and rabbits died, showing how negative an impact increased temperatures and heat can have on livestock. Cattle can also be negatively impacted by heat waves, in 1999 over 5000 cattle died during a heatwave in north-eastern Nebraska, and in July 1995, a heatwave killed over 4000 cattle in the mid-central U.S.	

	An article by Lees et al. focused on heat load in cattle. The term heat load refers to heat stress and its environmental impacts but additionally takes into account animal factors like body condition, coat color, and genotype. Climate change and increasing temperatures will lead to droughts, which will lead to scarcity of feed and water for grazing animals like cattle. The lack of sufficient food and water can lead to a decrease in growth and reproductive efficiency. When looking at the impacts of climate change on livestock, it's important to acknowledge the multiple stressors at play. Studies of sheep and goats evaluating the impact of multiple environmental stressors have found that when exposed to a single stressor, sheep and goats are able to cope. But, when additional stressors are added on, things like growth and reproduction are negatively impacted. This is an important distinction to make because when talking about climate change it's not just one factor that is impacting the health of livestock, it is a multitude of factors that in sum have a negative impact. 	

	In addition to metabolic disorders, oxidative stress, immune suppression, and death in livestock that can be caused by increasing temperatures, reproduction can also be negatively affected. Studies have shown that heat load can impair reproductive success in cattle, affecting both males and females.

1. Effect on males-

Heat load has a negative effect on male fertility, impacting “spermatogenesis and/or the viability of stored spermatozoa”. Following a heat stress incident, it can take as long as eight weeks for sperm to be viable again. Recent studies have been dedicated to evaluating how the scrotum thermoregulates the testicles during these heat load periods, which is important because sperm must be kept at a certain temperature to be fertile. Initial results have shown that the ability of the scrotum to thermoregulate weakens when a cattle is experiencing heat load.

2. Effect on females-

In terms of establishing and maintaining pregnancy, heat load impairs many functions including:
 Altered follicular development and dominance patterns
 Corpus luteum regression
 Impaired ovarian function
 Impaired oocyte quality and competence
 Embryonic development
 Increased embryonic mortality and early fetal loss
 Endometrial function
 Reduced uterine blood flow
 Conception rates are also negatively affected by heat load in cattle

Wildlife:

Climate change and increasing temperatures will also impact the health of wildlife animals as well. Specifically, climate change will impact wildlife disease, specifically affecting “geographic range and distribution of wildlife diseases, plant and animal phenology, wildlife host-pathogen interactions, and disease patterns in wildlife”.

Geographic Range and Distribution of Wildlife Diseases

Northern geographic shifts of disease vectors and parasitic disease in the Northern Hemisphere have likely been because of global warming. The geographic range of a lung parasite that impacts ungulates like caribou and mountain goats, Parelaphostrongylus odocoilei, has been shifting northward since 1995, and a tick vector for Lyme disease and other tick-borne zoonotic diseases known as Ixodes scapularis has been expanding its presence northward as well. It is also predicted that climate warming will also lead to changes in disease distribution at certain altitudes. At high elevation in the Hawaiian Islands, for example, it is expected that climate warming will allow for year-round transmission of avian malaria. This increased opportunity for transmission will likely be devastating to endangered native Hawaiian birds at those altitudes that have little or no resistance to the disease.   

Phenology and Wildlife Diseases

Phenology is the study of seasonal cycles, and with climate change the seasonal biologic cycles of many animals have already been affected. For example, the transmission of tick-borne encephalitis (TBE) is higher to humans when early spring temperatures are warmer. The warmer temperatures result in an overlap in feeding activity of ticks who are infected with the virus (nymphal) with ticks who aren't (larval). This overlapped feeding leads to more of the uninfected larval ticks acquiring the infection and therefore increases the risk of humans being infected with TBE. On the other hand, cooler spring temperatures would result in less overlapped feeding activity, and would therefore decrease the risk of zoonotic transmission of TBE.

Wildlife Host to Pathogen Interaction

The transmission of pathogens can be achieved through either direct contact from a diseased animal to another, or indirectly through a host like infected prey or a vector. Higher temperatures as a result of climate change results in an increased presence of disease producing agents in hosts and vectors, and also increases the “survival of animals that harbor disease”. Survival of Parelaphostrongylus tenuis, a brain worm of white-tailed deer that affects moose, could be increased due to the higher temperatures and milder winters that are caused by climate change. In moose, this brain causes neurological disease and eventually ends up being fatal. And with moose already being heat stressed due to climate change, they will unfortunately have an increased susceptibility to parasitic and infectious diseases like the brain worm.

Wildlife Disease Patterns  

Predicting the impact climate change might have on disease patterns in different geographic regions can be difficult, because its effects likely have high variability. This has been more evident in marine ecosystems than terrestrial environments, where massive decline in coral reefs has been observed due to disease spread.

Effects on the movement and infection rates of disease

Changes in climate and global warming have significant influences on the biology and distribution of vector-borne diseases, parasites, fungi, and their associated illnesses. Regional changes resulting from changing weather conditions and patterns within temperate climates will stimulate the reproduction of certain insect species that are vectors for disease. One major insect disease spreading species is mosquitoes, which can carry diseases like malaria, West Nile virus, and dengue fever. With regional temperatures changing from climate change the range of mosquitos will change as well. The range of mosquitoes will move farther north and south, and places will have a longer period of mosquito habitability than the current day, leading to an increase in the mosquito population in these areas. This range shift has already been seen in highland Africa. Since 1970, the incidence of malaria in high elevation areas in East Africa has increased greatly. This has been proven to be caused due to the warming of regional climates. Mosquitoes don't only carry diseases that affect humans. They also carry diseases like Dirofilaria immitis (dog heartworm). Therefore, tropical diseases will probably migrate and become endemic in many other ecosystems due to an increase in mosquito range.  Parasitics and fungal infections will also see an increase due to the warming of certain climates. In 2002 a woman died from a fungal infection of Cryptococcus gattii in Vancouver Island. This fungus is normally found in warmer climates such as in Australia. There are now two strains of this fungus in the Northwestern part of North America affecting many terrestrial animals. The spread of this fungus is hypothesized to be linked to climate change.

The vectors of transmission are the major reason for the increased ranged and infection of these diseases. If the vector has a range shift, so do the associated diseases; if the vector has now increased activity due to changes in climate, then there is an effect on the transmission of disease. However it will be hard to classify exactly why the range shifts or an increase in infection rates occurs as there are many other factors to consider besides climate change, such as human migration, poverty, infrastructure quality, land usage, etc., but climate change is still potentially a key factor.

The increased likelihood for extreme weather events due to climate change will also help to play a part to increase the spread of disease. Flooding can lead to water contamination, giving an increased chance for diseases, such as cholera to spread. These extreme weather events can also lead to food contamination. Extreme weather events could potentially carry diseases to new regions as well.

Migration

Range shifts
Range shifts are a natural response to climate change. Species with sufficient levels of mobility may respond quickly to environmental change, with species capable of undertaking long migratory movements likely to shift ranges first (Lundy et al., 2010). Migration is not limited to animal populations—plants can migrate via passive seed dispersal, establishing new individuals where conditions allow.

"The range of plants and animals are moving in response to recent changes in climate" (Loarie 2009). As temperature increases, ecosystems are particularly threatened when their niche has essentially nowhere else to move to. This hindrance is particularly prevalent in mountain ranges, for example. The speed at which climate is changing is derived from the ratio of temporal and spatial gradients of mean annual near-surface temperature.

"Mountainous biomes require the slowest velocities to keep pace with climate change. In contrast, flatter biomes, such as flooded grasslands, mangroves and deserts require much greater velocities. Overall, there is a strong correlation between topographic slope and velocity from temperature change" (Loarie 2009).

Temperatures are expected to rise more than average in higher latitudes and at higher elevations. Animals living at lower elevations could migrate to higher elevations in response to climate change as temperatures rises, whereas animals in higher elevations will eventually "run out of mountain". "Results confirmed that protected large-scale elevation gradients retain diversity by allowing species to migrate in response to climate and vegetation change. The long-recognized importance of protecting landscapes has never been greater" (Moritz 2008).

An example of this phenomenon is especially prevalent in the species Dendroctonus frontalis Zimmermann, also known as the Southern Pine beetle. As the terrestrial Range shifts have had a detrimental effect on the health of Northern US forests as the Pine beetle has begun to migrate north due to climate change. Native to Central America and Southeastern U.S, the Southern Pine beetle has become one of the most destructive species to North American forests as they continue to infest and then destroy trees by cutting off their access to water and nutrients. Studies have shown that since 2002, the beetles have been drifting northward about 55 miles per decade (Lesk et al., 2017). These beetles are increasing in population due to the rise in global temperatures; allowing them to spread further into North American territories and attack forests with rare and threatened ecosystems.

Lesk, C., Coffel, E., D’Amato, A. et al. Threats to North American forests from southern pine beetle with warming winters. Nature Clim Change 7, 713–717 (2017). https://doi.org/10.1038/nclimate3375

Over the past 40 years, species have been extending their ranges toward the poles and populations have been migrating, developing, or reproducing earlier in the spring than previously (Huntley 2007).

Similarly, dispersal and migration are crucial to preserving biodiversity as rapidly rising equatorial temperatures push an increasing number of species in poleward directions.

Adaptation
The 2007, IPCC's report stated that "adaptation will be necessary to address impacts resulting from the warming which is already unavoidable due to past emissions." (IPCC 2007)

In the face of impending climate changes, humans are realizing that environmental changes are acting as stressors on terrestrial populations. When changes in climate start to exceed optimal conditions for a population, an affected species will need to respond and adapt to new conditions in order to remain competitive and thriving.

Changes in phenology
As mentioned earlier, phenology is the changing of an animal's behavior because of climatic circumstances. It may or may not be genetic. The genetic changes in animal populations have evolved adaptation to the timing of seasonal events or to season length. For example, the Canadian red squirrels are reproducing earlier in the spring, thereby capitalizing on earlier spruce cone production (Huntley 2007).

Because of the increasing evidence that humans have had a significant impact on global climate over the previous centuries, many scientists wonder how species—and the ecosystems they live in—will adapt to these changes, or if they even can.

Usually the first and most easily detectable response is a change in the species' phenotype, or its physical features. But there is a debate among scientists over whether or not these changes reflect an adaptive genetic evolution or simply phenotypic plasticity.

A recently published study by Franks et al. sought to demonstrate that a shift in the annual flowering time of the Bassica rapa plant in response to a multi-annual drought in southern California is in fact an adaptive evolutionary response. Based on the study, they concluded that post-drought genotypes appeared to be better adapted to shorter growing seasons than the pre-drought genotypes, and that this was a result of adaptive evolution.

Huntley counters the findings of Franks et al. (Huntley 2007) with a study by Wu et al. (Wu L 1975) that provided evidence that not only different species but also different populations of the same species exhibited markedly different potentials for the selection of heavy-metal-tolerant genotypes.  This led Bradshaw and McNeilly to conclude that different populations of the same species can adapt their phenology to survive in the short term and at local sites, but genetic variation across an entire species in response to rapid climate change is not possible (Bradshaw 1991).

Huntley concludes that while some evolution is likely to occur in some species in relation to global climate change, it is unlikely to be sufficient to mitigate the effects of said changes, especially if they occur as rapidly as has happened in the past.

In refuting the findings of Franks et al., Huntley concludes:
"Although the demonstration of an evolutionary basis for a phenotypic response may be interesting, it is insufficient to overturn the conclusions of Bradshaw and McNeilly (Bradshaw 1991). Evolutionary adaptation is unlikely to be of major importance in the response of species to the climatic changes expected this century. Furthermore, even its limited potential is likely to be severely reduced as a consequence of habitat and population fragmentation, and of the rapidity and magnitude of the expected climatic changes, that together are likely to lead to rapid genetic impoverishment of many populations. A more likely outcome is that, rather as in the grasslands developed on heavy metal contaminated soils, a small number of species that happen to have the necessary genetic variance will come to dominate many plant communities, with potentially far-reaching consequences for biodiversity, ecosystem function and the ecosystem services upon which mankind depends" (Huntley 2007).

There are many ways that an animal can alter its behavior, including the timing of its reproduction, mating, and migration.

Evolutionary
Adaptive shifts in the timing of seasonal events should precede adaptive shifts of thermal optima or increased heat tolerance over evolutionary time, and that is the pattern that is emerging (Bradshaw 1991).

It has been hypothesized that as temperature increases, body size would decrease. Smaller body size would dissipate heat more efficiently, so in an increased temperature environment one would expect an animal to be smaller. The opposite also holds true: when temperature decreases, studies have shown with great correlation that body size increases. Climate change has been associated with changes in plant size as well as animal size.

The vulnerability of a species to environmental change depends on the species’ exposure and sensitivity to environmental change, its resilience to perturbation, and its potential to adapt to change.

Species basically have three options in combating the effects of climate change: move location, adapt, or die out and go extinct. Adaptation can be seen in two ways: genetic and phenotypic.

Relative to the rate of climate change, evolutionary change is usually considered to be too slow to allow for genetic adaptation among species. However, microevolution is a genetic adaptation that deals with heritable shifts in allele frequencies in a population and is not characterized by the slow process of speciation, or the formation of a new distinct species.  However, larger terrestrial animals usually cannot adapt with microevolution, as the rate of climate change is still too fast for this evolutionary process. Therefore, some terrestrial species, especially larger animals, have to depend on latent phenotypic plasticity. A plastic response to climate change includes expressing a different phenotype that may lead to differing morphology, phenology, or rate of activity . Unlike genetic adaptation, phenotypic plasticity allows the animal itself to respond to climate change without a change in its genetic makeup. This mechanism that allows this process involves changes in DNA packaging in the nucleus that alters the chance of a particular gene being expressed. Phenological changes are observed and taken as evidence that species are adjusting to environmental changes.

Although species may adapt to changing climates, either through genetic or phenotypic adaptation, all species have limits to their capacity for adaptive response to changing temperatures.

Factors contributing to adaptation

Short generational times improve adaptability; e.g., many microbial disease organisms, small insects, common fishery species and annual plants are thought to be more highly adaptive.

Wide dispersal areas allow animals to migrate and move to an environment better suitable in an effort to handle climate change.

Broad climatic tolerance is the ability of an animal to withstand a large range of conditions. For example, the kangaroo has a very broad climatic tolerance.

Generalists are non-habitat species in that they are not restricted to a very specific location, environment, food source, etc. The American coyote is an example of a generalist.

Opportunistic species feed and adapt to many changes.

Factors hindering adaptation
Long generation times limit the rate at which a species can become more varied.

Poorly dispersed animals are unable to migrate to escape and survive the climate change.

Narrow climatic tolerance in animals inhibits their adaptability, because their basic survival needs cannot range in location, temperature or resources.

A population confined to one geographic location, such as a population that lives in cold regions at the tops of low-lying mountains, does not have a simple option of migration. These animals are in habitats that will run out as climate change increases and global warming becomes more impactful.

Extinction or extirpation

According to Stuart L. Pimm and his coauthors, human actions have raised species' extinction or extirpation rates to three orders of magnitude above their natural background rates. Pimm says, "[Scientists] predict that 400 to 500 of the world's 8500 landbird species will go extinct by 2100 with a warming estimate of 2.8 degrees Celsius. A further 2150 species will be at risk of extinction" (Pimm 2009). Additionally, at least 17% of listed vertebrate species have been identified by the International Union for Conservation of Nature (IUCN) to be sensitive to climate change. This means that these species are decreasing in numbers or are losing their natural habitat because of changes in temperature and precipitation due to elevated atmospheric  levels.

However, only around 4% of all mammals that are deemed climate sensitive by the IUC have been studied in regards to linking their demographic composition (i.e. survival, development, and reproduction) to climate change. There is a large discrepancy between the locations of demographic studies and the species that are currently assessed as most vulnerable to climate change. It is also incredibly difficult for studies to focus specifically and determine a straightforward relationship between limited tolerance to high temperatures and local extinction, as a diverse set of factors, such as food abundance, human activity, and mismatched timing, can all play a role in a species’ local or mass extinction. In order to assess population viability under climate change, more coordinated actions need to be prioritized and taken in order to collect data on how different species’ demographic rates can persist and respond to climate change.

Global warming as caused by humans is confirmed by the IPCC fourth assessment to be "very likely". This being the case, a tipping point may be reached for many species, leading ultimately to extinction (Pimm 2009).

Current climate change influences species survival in a given area. Both climate warming and cooling can cause range shifts and local extinction of animals, but quantitative evidence is rare due to the lack of long-term spatial-temporal data. In a 2019 research study, researchers in China used historical records from the past 300 years to quantify both anthropogenic and climate stressors with the local extinction of 11 medium- and large-sized animals. Extreme temperature change was negatively associated with increased local extinction of mammals such as the gibbon, macaque, tiger, and water deer. Both global warming and cooling was found to cause local extinction of mammals. For example, the local extinction of mammal species such as pandas, rhinos, water deer, gibbon, and macaque that lived in tropical or subtropical regions of China was negatively correlated with temperature during the cold phase of the premodern period. Additionally, climate cooling may have contributed to large extinctions of tiger subspecies in the west and north of China during the cold pre modern time, while recent global warming might contribute to the complete extinction of tigers in southern China.

In Australia, the grey-headed robin is restricted to rainforests of the wet tropics region and another population in the New Guinea highlands. Although in some places it can be locally common, this bird's range is very restricted; it is found only in the northeast of Queensland, and there only in the higher-altitude rainforest. This is a projection of its range as climate change continues. This animal could be considered in danger of extinction.

A similar but more dramatic prediction is cast for the lemuroid ringtail possum. With a high enough temperature (climate) shift, this animal will become extinct.

Sometimes a species may react in one of the other two ways, by moving or by adapting, and yet find that its efforts do not save it from extinction. While not yet extinct, the European pied flycatcher, a small insectivorous bird that migrates to western Europe from Africa each spring, has declined to 10% of its former population. This has occurred at the same time as a main food source for the young flycatchers, caterpillars, have begun to peak much earlier. Although the birds have also begun to arrive earlier, they have not yet caught up to the peaking of the caterpillars. This individual species may or may not go extinct, but it demonstrates that a species can sometimes begin to move or adapt and yet find itself dying nevertheless (Pimm 2009).

Current extinction due to climate change 
There are few global species extinctions that are thought to have been caused by climate change. For example, only 20 of 864 species extinctions are considered by the IUCN to potentially be the result of climate change, either wholly or in part, and the evidence linking them to climate change is typically considered as weak or insubstantial. These species’ extinctions are listed in the table below. (* = species that are not globally extinct but are extinct in the wild. Note that in almost all cases, the links between extinction and climate change are highly speculative and obscured by other factors. The possible links between chytrid fungus and climate change in amphibians are discussed in the research article by Cahill et al., and here we merely say “chytrid” for brevity.)

However, there is abundant evidence for local extinctions from contractions at the warm edges of species' ranges. Hundreds of animal species have been documented to shift their range (usually polewards and upwards) as a signal of biotic change due to climate warming. Warm-edge populations tend to be the most logical place to search for causes of climate-related extinctions since these species may already be at the limits of their climatic tolerances. This pattern of warm-edge contraction provides indications that many local extinctions have already occurred as a result of climate change.

A National Geographic article originally published in June 2016 (and updated in 2019 after the Australian government officially recognized the species as extinct) reported the Bramble Cay melomys’ (Melomys rubicola) disappearance from its island called Bramble Cay in the Torres Strait of the Great Barrier Reef as the first mammal species recognized as extinct due to climate change. While the small rodent's last sighting was in 2009, failed attempts to trap any in late 2014 led scientists to announce that the species had gone extinct. The Bramble Cay melomys, also known as the mosaic-tailed rat, were first seen by Europeans on its island in 1845. The small low-lying island was at most 10 feet above sea level, and the island's vegetation had been shrinking due to rises in sea level. Since 1998, the rodents have lost about 97% of their habitat. The authors cite anthropogenic climate change-driven sea-level rise as a direct cause to the severe meteorological events that have caused destructive effects of extreme rising water levels to low-lying islands such as Bramble Cay. This small mammal's extinction is only one of many that face significant risk due to a warming climate, and those on small islands and mountains are most threatened, because they have few places to go when climate drastically changes.

See also
 Human impact on marine life
 Climate change and birds

References

Further reading
 
 IPCC, 2002: Climate Change and Biodiversity (PDF, 86 pp., 1008 KB, About PDF) [Gitay, Habiba, Suarez, Avelino, Watson, Robert T., and Dokken, David Jon, eds.]
 

 
 
 
 
 
 

Gade, Melanie, and Audrey Payne. “Half of Plant and Animal Species at Risk From Climate Change in World's Most Important Natural Places.” World WildLife, 2018. Accessed 26 April 2021.
Robbins, Jim. “With Temperatures Rising, Can Animals Survive the Heat Stress?” Yale Environment 360, 2020. Accessed 26 April 2021.
US Department of Interior. “9 Animals That are Feeling Impacts of Climate Change.” US Department of Interior, 2015. Accessed 27 April 2021.

Further reading
Animals on the Move; A warming climate means shifting ranges and mixed-up relationships for a lot of species June 30, 2012; Vol.181 #13 (p. 16) Science News
 Climate change miscues may shrink species’ outer limits.  Ecological partnerships are getting out of sync, especially at high latitudes  June 30, 2012; Vol.181 #13 (p. 13) Science News
 Study: Many mammals won't be able to outrun climate change 2012-05-14.  The study appeared in the journal Proceedings of the National Academy of Sciences and was led by Carrie Schloss, an ecologist at the University of Washington.
The Infography about Climate Change and Biodiversity

External links
Recent Research Shows Human Activity Driving Earth Towards Global Extinction Event (2014-06-09), Terry Root and Stuart Pimm, The Real News Network

Climate change and the environment
Effects of climate change
Zoology